Tametraline (CP-24,441) is the parent of a series of chemical compounds investigated at Pfizer that eventually led to the development of sertraline (CP-51,974-1).

Sertraline has been called "3,4-dichloro-tametraline". This is correct but it is an oversimplification in the sense that sertraline is the S,S-isomer whereas tametraline is the 1R,4S-stereoisomer. 

1R-Methylamino-4S-phenyl-tetralin is a potent inhibitor of norepinephrine uptake in rat brain synaptosomes, reverses reserpine induced hypothermia in mice, and blocks uptake of 3H-Norepinephrine into rat heart.

Tametraline is a norepinephrine-dopamine reuptake inhibitor.

Indatraline is an indanamine homolog of tetralin-based tametraline, although in the case of indatraline the product is pm-dichlorinated.

See also 
 Cyproheptadine [4-(5H-dibenz-[a,d]cyclohepten-5-ylidine)-1-methylpiperidine]
 Dasotraline
 Desmethylsertraline
 EXP-561 (1-amino-4-phenylbicyclo[2.2.2]octane)
 JNJ-7925476
 Lometraline
 Nefopam
 Sertraline

References 

1-Aminotetralins
Norepinephrine–dopamine reuptake inhibitors
Pfizer brands
Stimulants